GSX may refer to:

Gsx (gene family)
GSX Techedu, a large Chinese online tutoring company
Asurada GSX, a fictional racing car from Future GPX Cyber Formula
Buick GSX, a muscle car
Gandhi Smarak Road railway station, in Maharashtra, India
General Signal, a defunct American equipment manufacturer
Gibraltar Stock Exchange
Grand Strand Expressway, a proposed freeway in South Carolina
Graphics System Extension, a graphics library
Government Secure Extranet
Mitsubishi Eclipse GSX, a sport compact car
Suzuki GSX series of sport touring motorcycles
Suzuki GSX-R series of sport motorcycles